Niger pursues a moderate foreign policy and maintains friendly relations with both East and West. It is a member state of the United Nations. Niger maintains a special relationship with France and enjoys close relations with its West African neighbours.

Multilateral relations

It is a charter member of the Organization of African Unity and the West African Monetary Union and also belongs to the Niger Basin Authority and the Lake Chad Basin Commission, the Economic Community of West African States, the Non-Aligned Movement, and the Organisation of Islamic Cooperation. Niger belongs to the United Nations and its main specialized agencies and in 1980-81 served on the UN Security Council.  The first president of Niger, Hamani Diori, maintained close relations with the west and became internationally prominent in his diplomatic work, seeking to broker resolutions to conflicts in Africa and beyond.  He was particularly prominent in his involvement as a negotiator during the Nigerian Civil War.

Niger maintains a permanent purpose to the United Nations Headquarters in New York City, at 417 East 50th Street. In 2009, its Ambassador to the United Nations was Ibrahim A. Abani.

Bilateral relations

Other

Niger has only 24 permanent embassies abroad, although more have permanent representation in Niamey, either through national embassies or other representatives.  The United Kingdom, for instance, operates its permanent office for relations to Niger from Accra, Ghana, while Niger's permanent representative resides at the Nigerien Embassy in Paris.

Many other small or distant nations have no formal diplomatic relations with Niamey except through their respective consulates at the United Nations Headquarters in New York City.  Australia, for instance, only signed the instruments of formal diplomatic relations with Niamey on 7 May 2009, through their respective consular officials at the UN.

Border disputes
Libya has in the past claimed a strip along their border of about 19,400 km² in northern Niger. There have been several decades of unresolved discussions regarding the delimitation of international boundaries in the vicinity of Lake Chad between Niger, Nigeria, Chad, and Cameroon. The lack of firm borders, as well as the receding of the lake in the 20th century  led to border incidents  between Cameroon and Chad in the past.  An agreement has been completed and awaits ratification by Cameroon, Chad, Niger, and Nigeria.

Niger has an ongoing conflict with Benin over Lété Island, an island in the River Niger approx. 16 kilometres long and 4 kilometres wide, located  around 40 kilometers from the town of Gao, Niger. Together with other smaller islands in the River Niger, it was the main object of a territorial dispute between Niger and Benin, which had begun when the two entities were still under French rule. The island, and seasonally flooded land around it is valuable to semi-nomadic Puel cattle herders as a dry season pasturage. The two countries had almost gone to war over their border in 1963 but finally chose to settle by peaceful means. In the early 90s a joint delimitation commission was tasked with solving the issue but could not reach an agreement. In 2001 the two parties chose to have the International Court of Justice (ICJ) decide on the matter once and for all.  In 2005, the ICJ ruled in Niger's favour.

Niger has ongoing processes delimiting sections of their borders with Burkina Faso and Mali, disputes which date back to the colonial period.  These entities, along with Benin and other nations which do not border Niger, were semi independent elements of French West Africa.  Within the colonial administration, borders were frequently changed, with Niger colony once possessing large portions of what is now Burkina Faso and Mali, as well as much of northern Chad, later associated with French Equatorial Africa.  Disputes between these post-independence nations have been minor and peaceful.

See also
List of diplomatic missions in Niger
List of diplomatic missions of Niger

References

Stub created from US State Department Report, 2007.